Pullinque Hydroelectric Plant  is a hydroelectric power station in Los Ríos Region, Chile. The plant uses water from Pullinque Lake and produces  of electricity. The plant was built by ENDESA in 1962 but is currently owned by  Pullinque S.A. On October 16 of 2003 about 40 Mapuches occupied the plant claiming that it was built on land stolen from them. The occupation ended with an agreement about meeting in one week to discuss the problem.

References

Energy infrastructure completed in 1962
Energy infrastructure in Los Ríos Region
Hydroelectric power stations in Chile